Felice Giani (17 December 1758 – 10 January 1823) was an Italian painter of the Neoclassic style. His grand manner subjects often included Greco-Roman allusions or themes.

Biography
Born in San Sebastiano Curone near Alessandria, he moved to Pavia. In Pavia, he studied with Carlo Bianchi and Antonio Galli Bibiena. He moved to Bologna, in 1778, where he entered the studio of Domenico Pedrini and Ubaldo Gandolfi. He soon moved to Rome and found work in the decoration of the Palazzo Altieri. Between 1780 and 1786, he worked in various studios in Rome, under, for example, Pompeo Batoni and Christoph Unterberger. He then returned north to work in Faenza, where he worked with the quadratura painter Serafino Barozzi, and with Giovanni Battista Ballanti. In Faenza he was involved in a prolific series of projects including the fresco decoration of the Laderchi, Naldi and Milzetti Palaces. The latter is considered his masterpiece. In Bologna, he decorated the Palazzi Aldini, Marescalchi, Lambertini Ranuzzi, and Baciocchi. In Rome, he worked in the palace of the Embassy of Spain, Palazzo Quirinale, and he also did work in  Forlì, Ferrara, Ravenna and Venice. He befriended the Napoleonic French leaders, and traveled to Paris where he painted frescos in the villa of the Secretary of State of the Kingdom of Italy. It is there, where he is credited with co-establishing the French Empire style.

He first studied in Pavia, then sponsored by the patronage of marchese Luigi Botta, he continued studies at Bologna (1778–79), then at the Accademia di San Luca in Rome, under Bartoni, Cristoforo Unterberger, and architect Giovanni Antonio Antolini. Returns to Faenza in 1796 -1797 as collaborator of Serafino Lodovico Barozzi, and helps in the decoration of the Galleria dei Cento Pacifici. He helped establish the first Scuola Pubblica di Disegno, opened in 1796 under Giuseppe Zauli. In Faenza, Giani created a studio which had as pupils Gaetano Bertolani, Antonio Trentanove, the brothers Ballanti Graziani, and Marcantonio Trifogli.

In 1784, he won second prize in the painting competition of the Academy of Parma with a Samson and Delilah. In 1811, he joined the Accademia di San Luca and in 1819, the Congregation of the Virtuosi of the Pantheon.  He died after falling from his horse in Rome in 1823, and he is buried in the church of Sant'Andrea delle Fratte.

Legacy

His work is held in the collection of the Cooper-Hewitt, National Design Museum.

Books

References

 Grove Art Encyclopedia entry.
Web Gallery of Art biography.

1758 births
1823 deaths
People from the Province of Alessandria
18th-century Italian painters
Italian male painters
19th-century Italian painters
19th-century Italian male artists
Italian neoclassical painters
Fresco painters
18th-century Italian male artists